"Storyteller" is the sixteenth episode of the seventh and final season of the television series Buffy the Vampire Slayer. "Storyteller" refers to Andrew Wells, who has become a pseudo-member of the Scooby Gang after being a villain in the previous season, and has been held hostage at Buffy's home since early in the season.

Plot
Desiring to make a record of the events leading up to the apocalypse, in case humans survive, so that they will know what Buffy and her allies did, Andrew, taking refuge in the bathroom, describes his own version of "Buffy, Slayer of the Vampyres" to a video camera (imagining that he is situated in an old library with a roaring fire, dressed in a smoking jacket and holding a pipe). Later, Andrew talks to the video camera and uses his big white board to illustrate and explain the array of evil forces in Sunnydale. He interviews various members of the household, blithely re-imagining current and past incidents in an idealized and incorrect way.

Buffy arrives at the school to find two boys fighting, a shy girl turning invisible because of her unpopularity, and various other disturbances. Buffy finds Principal Wood, who has just been injured by a thrown rock. As she bandages his head, they discuss the bizarre yet familiar chaos dominating the school. She explains her suspicions that the activation of the Seal of Danzalthar is behind the morning's chaos. They investigate the newly uncovered seal in the school basement. As Wood gets close to the seal, he is infused with evil. In a demonic voice, he berates Buffy for her involvement with Spike. Buffy pulls Wood away, freeing him; he recalls nothing.

At the Summers' home, Andrew continues his interviews. He causes Xander and Anya to re-examine their feelings for each other. Wood and Buffy arrive and inform Andrew he is going to help close the Seal; it is now surrounded by five possessed students and glowing with light. A magically forced memory allows Andrew to locate the magically charged knife the First wanted him to use to sacrifice Jonathan. Buffy tells Andrew that she believes that he can help her quiet the seal. They leave for the school, accompanied by Spike and Wood. They arrive to find that the school is being destroyed by ongoing student riots.

Andrew tries to film their walk through the halls, but they are attacked by several students who possess enhanced strength. Buffy and Andrew make their way to the basement while Spike and Wood guard the stairway entrance. As they walk, Andrew revisits his memories of killing Jonathan, relating several different versions of the story as if each are true. They enter the basement room carefully and find five students standing around the seal, their eyes freshly cut and sealed (like the Bringers). In the Summers' basement, Xander and Anya revel in the aftermath of having sex again before quietly pondering on moving on with their lives. At the school, Spike and Wood are attacked by more students. Spike inadvertently confirms that he killed Wood's mother, and Robin makes a failed attempt to stake Spike from behind; in the chaos of the fight, his actions go unnoticed.

Buffy battles the new Bringers while Andrew records the scene with his camera. Once she has killed the Bringers, Buffy pulls out the knife and advances on Andrew, revealing that they must spill his blood to quiet the Seal, since he was the one who initially activated it. Buffy describes the bitter prospects for their future, and chastises his constant attempts to avoid taking responsibility for his actions. Andrew, frightened to tears, admits how willingly he had murdered Jonathan, and how he regrets his actions and deserves whatever happens to him. Buffy leans Andrew over the Seal so that his tears fall on its surface. The Seal closes and becomes quiet, stopping the violence in the school. Buffy reveals to Andrew that tears, not blood, were necessary to close the seal; she has no plans to kill him and apologizes for making him think she would do so. When Andrew asks her if she would have followed through with killing him if blood was the answer, she does not answer and quietly walks away from him.

Later, a sad Andrew talks to the camera in the bathroom again, confessing that he probably will die, and that he deserves to. Without another word, he shuts the camera off.

References

External links

 

Buffy the Vampire Slayer (season 7) episodes
2003 American television episodes
Television episodes written by Jane Espenson